The Cape Henlopen School District (CHSD) is a public school district in Sussex County, Delaware in the United States. The district is based in an unincorporated area with a Lewes postal address, and serves the Cape Region in eastern Sussex County.

Cape Henlopen School District was established in 1969. Communities served by the district include Lewes, Henlopen Acres, Rehoboth Beach, Dewey Beach, and Milton.

History
It was created in 1969 by the merger of the Lewes, Milton, and Rehoboth school districts.

In March 2016, voters approved of a bond referendum to build new schools, with 74% of voters, numbering 2,947, choosing yes.

Schools
 High school
Cape Henlopen High School
 Middle schools
Beacon Middle School
Mariner Middle School
A new middle school with a capacity of 600 students is planned in Lewes. It will be built on the previous campus of Shields Elementary. ABHA Architects is the architectural firm. Its facility will not be as large as the former Shields Elementary, and its opening is scheduled for 2024. It will have a capacity of about 500 students.

 Elementary schools
Brittingham (H.O.) Elementary School
The original school was built in 1966. The current school was built on the grounds of the previous facility, with groundbreaking in 2017. The roof has a learning area. Compared to the original building, there is more space for kindergarten and first grade classrooms.
Love Creek Elementary School
On the other side of Beacon Middle School, it has two sections. It has a two-story grade 2-5 wing with grades 2-3 and 4-5 on their respective upper and lower floors; each grade has six classrooms. There is a separate kindergarten wing and a separate first grade wing; the kindergarten classrooms have in-suite bathrooms. The rooms are arranged in hub formats. Love Creek Elementary is on a  plot of land, and was to be  of space. The price tag was about $29 million. It was to absorb about 100-200 students from each of the existing schools.
It opened in 2017. Of the schools that opened in its bond cohort, it was the only new school.
Milton Elementary School
Rehoboth Elementary School
It is on a  plot of land. The current building was to open in 2019. It has  of space. In the same location as the former building, uses the same design as Brittingham and Love Creek schools. It had a cost of $33 million. It has features that refer to the local area.
Shields (Richard A.) Elementary School
 The original Shields Elementary opened in 1966. In 1987, 1994, and 2007 the building was either given an addition or it was renovated. The school had about 800 students until 2017, when the student body declined to 550, as Love Creek Elementary opened and took some of the students. The district planned to demolish the current Shields facility in 2022, so it could build a new middle school on the site, and Shields Elementary will be moved to the first Lewes School building. The gymnasium was preserved while the Little Vikings section, a 1921 addition at Lewes School, was demolished. The district plans to build new two story additions at the Lewes School building. The new school will have a capacity of about 650 students.
 Alternative
Sussex Consortium (Lewes)

 Former schools
 Ninth Grade Campus
 Lewes Middle School
 Milton Middle School

Notable alumni
 Bryan Stevenson, lawyer, activist, author, law professor; founder and executive director of Equal Justice Initiative based in Montgomery, Alabama.
John Morris – MLB pitcher, born in Lewes
Jimmie Allen American country singer

See also
List of school districts in Delaware

References

External links
 Cape Henlopen School District

School districts in Sussex County, Delaware
1969 establishments in Delaware
School districts established in 1969